= Kermanshah Christian cemetery =

Former cemetery in Kermanshah, Iran

Kermanshah's Christian's Cemetery is a collection of graves belonging to the Armenians and also graveyards of Christians in Kermanshah in the western part of Iran, which is in ruins.

== Destruction of the cemetery ==
The Destruction of the Christian's Cemetery in Kermanshah is a fact that occurred in June 2017. The graves in the cemetery belongs to the Armenians and the Christians, which the municipality of Kermanshah has destroyed it by irrigating the cemetery grounds. A large part of this cemetery has been acquired and sold by the municipality in the recent years and has been under construction for residential buildings. As a result, the large cemetery has left just a small part which is also being destroyed.

== Background ==
Before the 1979 Revolution in Iran, many Christians lived in Kermanshah. The two largest churches belonging to the Assyrians, with the names of Pentecosti and Armenian on the Shari'ati Street of Kermanshah, were also their place of worship. But the Armenian Church was destroyed in 2002. The British Consulate in Shahnaz Square or Ghadir and the Iranian and American Association were also a part of Kermanshah's famous Christian buildings which both of them were destroyed by the Islamic Republic of Iran. There are also reports of destroying Christian monuments in Iran

== Related Events ==
The following are examples of the destruction of the Christian cemeteries in the recent years Iran:

- The destruction of the Ahwazi Christian Cemetery and the theft of the Armenian and the Poles churchyards in the city.

- The destruction of the Bushehr Christian Cemetery in the Bahmni area and memorials of the British in Bushehr.

- The complete destruction of an old Christian cemetery dating back 200 years in the castle city of Kerman. It was registered in 2008 as a part of national works and should have been protected and renovated.

- The Tehran Cemetery of Christians (Dolab), which after the Second World War has been named by hundreds of Polish officers and doctors of the Reza Shah Court and many other Armenians, Catholics, and Protestants artists, is also being destroyed.
